Lewis Brian Adams (1809 – 27 June 1853) was an English painter who spent most of his career in Venezuela. He studied at the Royal Academy of Arts in London and exhibited there for a number of years. Why he went to Caracas is unknown, but it seems likely that it was to paint in a market where he would find less competition. He introduced a number of trends from English portraiture to the world of Venezuelan art.

Adams became acquainted with the Prussian painter Ferdinand Bellermann during the latter's time in Venezuela.

References

Leading Figures in Venezuelan Painting of the Nineteenth Century, Inter-American Development Bank Cultural Center, exhibition catalogue

19th-century English painters
English male painters
Venezuelan painters
1809 births
1853 deaths
19th-century English male artists